Naalvar Nanna Mani Maalai   in Tamil நால்வர் நான்மணி மாலை  written by Siva Prakasar, who is also known as  ‘Siva anuputhi selvar, ‘Karpanai Kalangiyam’, ‘Thurai mangalam Sivaprakasar'. It is also one among the literary works by Sivaprakasa swamigal.

Overview
These  poems  were compiled as Venpa, Viruthan, Kalithurai, Agaval.

Poet
He is  son of Kumara Swamy Desikar and brother of Velaiyar, Karunai Prakasar and Gnambikai ammal.

Verses and Explanation

Each poem of Naalvar Naan Mani Maalai is generally named by the first few words of the poem. These are given first and a translation into verse given then:-

Translations
Naalvar Mani Maalai  is also translated into  English verses

References

Tamil-language literature
Hymns
Texts related to Nayanar saints
17th-century poems